Hitler's Lost Sub is a 120 minutes episode of the television series Nova (Season 28, Episode 3). It was first aired on the 14th of November, 2000. It was  directed by Kirk Wolfinger and written by Rushmore DeNooyer.

Interviewees
Bernard Cavalcante
John Chatterton
Dieter Kohl
Richie Kohler
Erich Topp
J. Gordon Vaeth
Horst von Schroeter

External links
Hitler's Lost Sub, at IMDB

American documentary television films
2000 American television episodes
Nova (American TV program) episodes
2000 television films
2000 films
2000 documentary films
World War II television documentaries
Documentary films about Adolf Hitler
2000s American films